Telecential was a cable TV provider based in Hemel Hempstead, Hertfordshire. It was notable for running one of the first community-based TV stations, West Herts TV, and for developing cable television services in Reading, Berkshire.  Later on, they expanded their network to Bletchley now a part of Milton Keynes Borough, though since the network has lain abandoned as of 2019, it is unclear if it was ever switched on; Northamptonshire (through their acquisition of County Cable) and Swindon (through their acquisition of Swindon Cable).  Telecential was jointly owned by CUC Broadcasting Ltd. and Telus.

Timeline of consolidation
 Telecential were bought by Comtel with its HQ in Wokingham
 Comtel were bought by Cabletel with its HQ in Hook, Hampshire
 Cabletel rebranded as NTL
 NTL merged with Telewest branded as ntl: Telewest
 ntl: Telewest bought Virgin Mobile and, separately, re-branded as Virgin Media
 Virgin Media was later acquired by Liberty Global in 2013.  Liberty Global was a successor to TCI, one of the founders of Telecential, bringing the consolidation full-circle.

References

Cable television companies of the United Kingdom
Companies based in Hemel Hempstead